The Silicon Valley Toxics Coalition (SVTC) was formed in San Jose, California- as a research and advocacy group that promoted safe environmental practices in the high tech industry. The organization was founded in 1982 after leaks at manufacturing sites at IBM and Fairchild Electronics were suspected of causing widespread birth defects and health issues in the Silicon Valley.

SVTC advocated for a toxic-free future with environmental and social justice improvements. On their website they stated that “[Their] goal is environmental sustainability and clean production, improved health, and democratic decision-making for communities and workers most affected by the high-tech revolution.”

The group was originally composed of high tech workers, community members, law enforcement, emergency workers and environmentalists. They aimed to educate the masses on best practices for computer recycling and promote corporate social responsibility on subjects ranging from nanotechnology, solar, and consumer e-waste. Regarding E-Waste, SVTC promoted using materials and methods that are more ecologically friendly in the production of electronics. SVTC also encouraged the establishment of Extended Producer Responsibility, making producers responsible for their products’ disposal. Acknowledging the negative impact of sending e-waste containing harmful toxins overseas to prisons and to underdeveloped nations, SVTC exposes those companies who participate in this means of disposal and hold them accountable. 

During the past few years, after a change in leadership,  SVTC has worked in the area of solar energy.  SVTC details the negative effects of solar energy’s increased growth and expansion in the US. Solar panels contain the toxic materials that are also found in other e-waste and can, therefore, be equally as harmful to dispose of. To help with this, SVTC has worked with the University of Edinburgh to develop a solar scorecard to help consumers and designers in Sub Saharan Africa and South Asia to decide their purchase hinged upon three sections: service and spare parts, repairability, and recyclability. Furthermore, SVTC constructed the Green Jobs Platform for solar to try to improve the economy and the environment. Both the solar industry as well as the principles of the social and environmental justice were incorporated together on this platform to create global supply, production, and recycling operations.

Ted Smith, author of Challenging the Chip, founded the organization and was Executive Director for 25 years, but Sheila Davis now spearheads their efforts.

Citizens at Risk 
Citizens at Risk: How Electronic Waste is Poisoning the Path Out of Poverty for India's Recyclers is a 13-minute documentary by the Silicon Valley Toxics Coalition, Chintan (India), and IMAK (India). It exposes the "global exploitation of the poor by a consumerist society and indifferent, irresponsible manufacturers exporting from the United states and other countries." The film was shot and produced in India and contains English narration. The film premiered at the Silicon Valley Toxics Coalition's 2008 benefit.

Projects and investigations
 Nano Technology: On April 2, 2008, the Silicon Valley Toxics Coalition released a report on the nanotechnology's negative impact on community and environmental health.
 Digital TV Switchover: June 12, 2009, is the deadline for the television industry to switch from broadcasting in analog format to digital.  It is anticipated that this change will create an enormous wave of e-waste of up to 80 million televisions becoming obsolete and discarded.
 India E-waste: To help address the global problem of electronic waste SVTC is teaming up with Chintan Environmental Research and Action Group on a research project to document the impact of e-waste on workers and communities in and around Delhi, India.
 Solar Recycling Database: SVTC is developing a Solar Recycling Database by bringing together users, researchers, and companies. According to the SVTC, there are three main goals with the use of the Solar Recycling Database. The first one addresses the disposal, waste management, and recycling of a product when one is done with its use. The second goal is to publicize the development of solar photovoltaic technologies as it is responsible for our high-quality energy. And lastly, the third goal is to expand and create new economic opportunities to properly reuse, recover, or recycle of photovoltaic items. Overall, the Solar Recycling Database informs the public of sustainable ways to get rid of an electronic material without hurting the environment as well as better approaches to solar waste prevention.

Reports
 2004: "Poison PCs and Toxic TVs" details the growing amounts of e-waste piling up in the U.S. The report includes information about the toxics contained in the computers and monitors and the hazards of improper disposal.
 2006: A report exposing the abuse of prison labor in the e-waste recycling industry. For the first time, prison inmates and staff blow the whistle on deplorable health and safety conditions within UNICOR, a controversial government corporation operated under the Department of Justice that uses captive prison labor in a range of industries, including the dismantling of toxic e-waste.
 2008: A report regarding the nanotechnology boom and how it mirrors the Silicon Valley semiconductor boom of the early 1980s. According to the report, further studies, legal structure, and safety should be required of nanotechnology companies.
 2009: A report entitled "Toward a Just and Sustainable Solar Energy Industry" was released, documenting and analyzing the environmental and health hazards of solar panel systems. It also included recommendations for building a just and sustainable solar energy industry.

See also
Cancer Alley (in Louisiana)
Computers and the environment
Green computing
Lauren Ornelas
Massachusetts Toxics Use Reduction Institute
Sustainable Electronics Initiative (SEI)
Sustainable Silicon Valley (SSV)
 Silicon Wadi

References

External links
 The Silicon Valley Toxics Coalition Website
 MySpace page
 Official SVTC Blog

Environmental organizations based in the San Francisco Bay Area
Research institutes in the San Francisco Bay Area
Silicon Valley